Incheon Bus Terminal Station is a subway station on Line 1 of the Incheon Subway located at 14 Gwangyo-dong, Nam-gu, Incheon, South Korea.

Station layout

Exits

References

Michuhol District
Seoul Metropolitan Subway stations
Railway stations in South Korea opened in 1999
Metro stations in Incheon